Mechane (also spelled Mishan) is a municipality in the Byblos District of  Keserwan-Jbeil Governorate, Lebanon. Its inhabitants are predominantly Maronite Catholics and Shia Muslims.

References

Populated places in Byblos District
Maronite Christian communities in Lebanon
Shia Muslim communities in Lebanon